Danielle Nicole Wyatt (born 22 April 1991) is an English cricketer who plays for Sussex, Southern Vipers, Southern Brave and England. She plays as an all-rounder, batting right-handed and bowling right-arm off break. She made her England debut against India in Mumbai on 1 March 2010.

Early career
Wyatt is a right-handed opening/middle order batter and off break bowler. Wyatt played for Staffordshire Ladies and Meir Heath Women in the Northern Premier League, having moved from Gunnersbury at the end of the 2012 season, as well as men's club cricket for her local club Whitmore.

In 2010, she was awarded an MCC Young Cricketers contract which enables her cricketing development via training at the MCC on a daily basis. She is the holder of one of the first tranche of 18 ECB central contracts for women players, which were announced in April 2014.

Career
Wyatt was a member of the winning women's team at the 2017 Women's Cricket World Cup held in England.

In December 2017, she was named as one of the players in the ICC Women's T20I Team of the Year.

In March 2018, during the 2018 Women's T20I Tri Nations Series in India; in a match against India, she scored her 2nd WT20I century in her career as her knock of 124 runs powered England to register the highest ever successful chase by any team in a WT20I match (199/3). With this century, she became the second female cricketer to score 2 centuries in WT20Is after Deandra Dottin and also registered the second highest individual score in a WT20I just behind Meg Lanning's 126. Her innings of 124 runs is also the highest individual score set by an opener in a WT20I match and she also recorded the second fastest century by a player in a WT20I innings (52 balls) just after Deandra Dottin's 38-ball century.

In October 2018, she was named in England's squad for the 2018 ICC Women's World Twenty20 tournament in the West Indies.

In November 2018, she was named in the Melbourne Renegades' squad for the 2018–19 Women's Big Bash League season. In February 2019, she was awarded a full central contract by the England and Wales Cricket Board (ECB) for 2019. In June 2019, the ECB named her in England's squad for their opening match against Australia to contest the Women's Ashes.

In December 2019, in England's opening match against Pakistan in Malaysia, Wyatt scored her first century in a WODI match. During the same tour, she also played her 100th WT20I match against Pakistan. In January 2020, she was named in England's squad for the 2020 ICC Women's T20 World Cup in Australia.

On 18 June 2020, Wyatt was named in a squad of 24 players to begin training ahead of international women's fixtures starting in England following the COVID-19 pandemic.

In February 2021, she went on England's tour of New Zealand, helping them complete a 2–1 WODI series win and a 3–0 WT20I series win. She was also drafted by Southern Brave for the inaugural season of The Hundred.

In December 2021, Wyatt was named in England's squad for their tour to Australia to contest the Women's Ashes. In February 2022, she was named in England's team for the 2022 Women's Cricket World Cup in New Zealand. In April 2022, she was bought by the Southern Brave for the 2022 season of The Hundred.

In July 2022, she was named in England's team for the cricket tournament at the 2022 Commonwealth Games in Birmingham, England.

International centuries

One Day International centuries

T20 International centuries

Personal life
Wyatt's nickname is "Waggy". In 2015, she explained to sports journalist Clare Balding that "The girls say I’m a wannabe WAG because I’ve dated two footballers!"  In March 2023, Wyatt became engaged to Georgie Hodge, a football agent.

References

Further reading

External links

1991 births
Living people
Cricketers from Stoke-on-Trent
England women One Day International cricketers
England women Twenty20 International cricketers
Staffordshire women cricketers
Victoria women cricketers
Nottinghamshire women cricketers
Melbourne Renegades (WBBL) cricketers
Sussex women cricketers
Lancashire Thunder cricketers
Southern Vipers cricketers
IPL Supernovas cricketers
IPL Velocity cricketers
Southern Brave cricketers
Brisbane Heat (WBBL) cricketers
Cricketers at the 2022 Commonwealth Games
Commonwealth Games competitors for England